Andrej Martin was the defending champion, but he lost in the final to Tobias Kamke.

Seeds

Draw

Finals

Top half

Bottom half

External links
 Main Draw
 Qualifying Draw

Svijany Open - Singles
2015 Singles